Percy Ashton (28 March 1909 – 1985) was an English football goalkeeper who played for Nottingham Forest in the Football League from 1930 to 1939.

Career
Ashton joined Nottingham Forest in 1930 from West Melton Excelsior and played for them until the outbreak of World War II in 1939. He made his Forest debut against Stoke City in September 1930. He joined Grantham Road in 1945.

References

1909 births
1985 deaths
English footballers
Association football goalkeepers
Nottingham Forest F.C. players
People from Bolton upon Dearne